Frederick of Saxe-Lauenburg (colloquially Sachsen-Lauenburg) (1554–1586), was a cathedral canon at Strasbourg Minster, chorbishop at Cologne Cathedral and cathedral provost (Dompropst), a function including the presidency of the chapter, at Bremen Cathedral.

Life
He was the youngest child of Francis, Duke of Saxe-Lauenburg (Franz I. von Sachsen-Lauenburg) and his wife, Sibylle of Saxony, daughter of the influential Duke Henry IV the Pious of Saxony and his wife, Katharina of Mecklenburg. Of his six brothers, he and Henry (1550–1585) followed the ecclesiastical career. Frederick was raised Lutheran, but educated Catholic. Together with Henry he studied at the University of Cologne under law professor Dr. Conrad Betzdorf, who housed him and his brother and was their mentor.

Henry was Prince-Archbishop of Bremen (as Henry III, 1567–1585), Prince-Bishop of Osnabrück (as Henry II, 1574–1585) and of Paderborn (as Henry IV, 1577–1585). As Prince-Bishop of Paderborn, Henry succeeded Salentin von Isenberg in 1577. He was the first archbishop to convert to Lutheranism and keep his honors.  In 1575, he married Anna von Broich in Hagen im Bremischen, the daughter of a city councillor of Cologne, and died in 1585 in an equestrian accident in Vörde.

Frederick succeeded Bremen's cathedral provost Ludwig von Varendorf in 1570, while his brother Henry officiated as Administrator of Bremen, Frederick was followed by Provost Theodor von Galen. During the Cologne War (1583–1589), he raised an army to fight for the Catholic faction of the cathedral chapter.  He was instrumental in securing the town of Kaiserswerth in 1583 for Ernest of Bavaria, the rivalling elector-archbishop of Cologne.

In 1586, during the Campaign in Cologne's Upper Electorate-Archbishopric at Hülchrath, he was part of the Ferdinand's force; in the attack on the castle, the Bavarian force was repulsed, but he himself mortally wounded. He died in Cologne shortly after the battle.

Ancestry

Sources

Bibliography

 Hennes, Johann Heinrich. Der Kampf um das Erzstift Köln zur Zeit der Kurfürsten. Köln: DuMont-Schauberg, 1878.
 

House of Ascania
Dukes of Saxe-Lauenburg
1554 births
1586 deaths
Sons of monarchs